The 1946–47 AHL season was the 11th season of the American Hockey League. Ten teams played 64 games each in the schedule. The Cleveland Barons won their fifth F. G. "Teddy" Oke Trophy as West Division champions. The Hershey Bears won their first Calder Cup.

Team changes
 The New Haven Eagles are renamed the New Haven Ramblers.
 The Springfield Indians resume operations, playing in the East Division.
 A new Philadelphia Rockets joined as an expansion team, playing in the East Division.
 The Buffalo Bisons switch from the East Division to the West Division.

Final standings
Note: GP = Games played; W = Wins; L = Losses; T = Ties; GF = Goals for; GA = Goals against; Pts = Points;

Scoring leaders

Note: GP = Games played; G = Goals; A = Assists; Pts = Points; PIM = Penalty minutes

 complete list

Calder Cup playoffs

See also
List of AHL seasons

References
AHL official site
AHL Hall of Fame
HockeyDB

American Hockey League seasons
2